Silver Lake is a small lake in Orange County, New York, located adjacent to New York State Route 17 exit 120 northeast of Middletown in Wallkill.

References

Lakes of Orange County, New York